Cáceres is a city of Spain located in the autonomous community of Extremadura. It is the capital and most populated municipality of the province of Cáceres.

Cáceres lies at the feet of the Sierra de la Mosca, a modest hill range. It is part of the Vía de la Plata ("Silver Route") path of the Camino de Santiago that crosses the west of the Iberian Peninsula in a north–south direction.

In 2014 its population was around 96,000. The medieval walled city has been declared a UNESCO World Heritage Site.

History
There have been settlements near Cáceres since prehistoric times. Evidence of this can be found in the caves of Maltravieso and El Conejar. The city was founded by the Romans in 25 BC.

The Old Town (Parte Antigua) still has its ancient walls; this part of town is also well known for its multitude of storks' nests. The walls contain a medieval town setting with no outward signs of modernity, which is why many television shows and films have been shot there. The Universidad de Extremadura, and two astronomical observatories are situated in Cáceres. The city is also a seat of the Roman Catholic Diocese of Coria-Cáceres.

Cáceres was declared a World Heritage City by UNESCO in 1986 because of the city's blend of Roman, Moorish, Northern Gothic and Italian Renaissance architecture. Thirty towers from the Islamic period still stand in Cáceres, of which the Torre del Bujaco is the most famous.

The origins of Cáceres were in prehistoric times, as evidenced by the paintings in the Cueva de Maltravieso (Cave of Maltravieso). The cave contains hundreds of paintings including the world's oldest known cave painting which is a red hand stencil older than 67,000 years. This is 20,000 years before the known arrival of Homo sapiens to Europe and therefore is believed to have been made by Neanderthals. Visitors can see remains from medieval times, the Roman occupation, Moorish occupation and the Golden age of Jewish culture in Spain. Cáceres has four main areas to be explored: the historical quarter, the Jewish quarter, the modern centre, and the outskirts.

The first evidence of humans living in Cáceres is from the Late Paleolithic era, around 25,000 BC. Cáceres as a city was founded as Castra Caecilia by Quintus Caecilius Metellus Pius and started to gain importance as a strategic city under Roman occupation, and remains found in the city suggest that it was a thriving center as early as 25 BC. Some remains of the first city walls built by the Romans in the 3rd and 4th centuries still exist, including one gateway, the Arco del Cristo.

After the fall of the Western Roman Empire, the city was occupied by the Visigoths, and entered a period of decline until the Moroccans conquered Cáceres in the 8th century. The city spent the next few centuries mostly under Moorish rule, although power alternated several times between Moors and Christians. During this time, the Moroccans rebuilt the city, including a wall, palaces, and various towers, including the Torre de Bujaco. Cáceres was reconquered by the Christians in the 13th century (1229). During this period the city had an important Jewish quarter: in the 15th century when the total population was 2,000, nearly 140 Jewish families lived in Cáceres. The Jewish population was expelled by Queen Isabella and Ferdinand of Aragon in 1492, but many remains of the Jewish presence of the period can still be seen today in the Barrio San Antonio.

Cáceres flourished during the Reconquista and the Discovery of the Americas, as influential Spanish families and nobles built homes and small palaces there, and many members of families from Extremadura participated in voyages to the Americas where they made their fortunes. In the 19th century, Cáceres became the capital of the province, marking a period of growth which was halted by the Spanish Civil War. Today, the headquarters of the university as well as several regional government departments are found in Cáceres.

Climate
The city of Cáceres is located in the province of Cáceres, in the Extremadura region of western central Spain.
The city has a Hot-summer Mediterranean climate (Köppen: Csa) which is tempered by its proximity to the Atlantic Ocean. In winter the average temperature does not exceed  maximum, reaching  minimum, with some frost. Rainfall is abundant in the months of October, November, March, April and May, but very intermittent.

Historic Quarter

The "Monumental City of Cáceres" was declared by the Council of Europe as the Third Monumental Complex of Europe in 1968 (after Prague and Tallinn) and World Heritage by Unesco in 1986. Cáceres also has other awards: Pomme d'Or to "Tourism Merit", awarded by the International Federation of Tourism Journalists and Writers in 1996; Les Etoiles d'Or du Jumelage, awarded by the European Commission in 1999; The Archival prize awarded to him by the Association for the Recovery of Historical Centers in 2004 and the Citizens 2008 Award granted by the Association of Radio and Digital Television Entities, with the collaboration of the Citizen Audiovisual Council for the support that the citizenship provided to The candidacy for the European Capital of Culture of 2016. Cáceres is also a member of the Roads Networks of Sefarad, of the Vía de la Plata, being chosen by the Autonomous Community as Cultural Capital of Extremadura Enclave 92, and together with the solidarity effort of The administrations, private companies, official entities and private citizens, aspired between 2003 and 2010 to be European Capital of Culture in the year 2016.

Main sights

Cathedrals, churches, convents and monasteries
 Convento de San Pablo (15th century)
 Convento de Santa Clara
 Convento Jerónimas
 Convent de la Compañía de Jesus, in Baroque style, today used for art exhibitions
 Iglesia de Santa María, cathedral built in the 13th century, in Gothic style
 Iglesia de San Mateo, a 15th-century church built on the site of a former mosque
 Iglesia de San Francisco Javier (18th century), in Baroque style
 Iglesia de San Juan, large majestic church built between the 13th and 15th century
 Iglesia de Santo Domingo
 Monasterio de Santa María de Jesús
 Parroquia de San Blas
 Parroquia de Nuestra Señora del Rosario de Fátima
 Parroquia Sagrada Familia
 Parroquia de San José (Cáceres)
 Parroquia San Juan Macías
 Ermita (Hermitage) de las Candelas
 Ermita (Hermitage) del Calvario
 Ermita (Hermitage) de la Paz
 Ermita de San Antonio
 Ermita del Vaquero
 Ermita del Cristo del Amparo
 Ermita de San Marcos el Nuevo (San Marquino)
 Ermita de San Ildefonso
 Santuario de Nuestra Señora la Virgen de la Montaña

Education
The University of Extremadura (founded in 1973) has a campus in Cáceres.

Transport
Cáceres is situated close to the Autovía A-66 from Seville to Gijón. Cáceres railway station serves around 100,000 passengers a year.

Festivals
 The Festival of the Martyrs (La Fiesta de los mártires) is held in January.
 Carnival, The Festival of the Candles (La Fiesta de las Candelas) and Fiesta de San Blas are held in February.
 The Easter Festival Semana Santa is held during the week before Easter Sunday. Processions wind through the narrow streets in the historical center.
 The San Jorge Festival, held on 22–23 April, involves a dragon being burnt in a bonfire in the town square (La Plaza Mayor), accompanied by a fireworks display.
 WOMAD music festival is held at the beginning of May.
 Ferias de San Fernando is held at the end of May.
 Fleadh Cáceres is a new (2003) cultural event that occurs between October and November months. The idea comes from Fleadh Cheoil which is an Irish music event that happens every August in Ireland.
 Festival de Cáceres - Film Festival

Museums
 Cáceres Museum - ALJIBE - housed in La Casa de las Veletas y la Casa de los Caballos in the historical quarter.
 La Casa-Museo Árabe, between the Plaza San Jorge and the Arco del Cristo. Arab culture, art and remains.
 Museo Concatedral de Cáceres, in the Plaza Santa Maria. Religious art.
 Museo Piedrilla - Guayasamín

Nature reserves and rural tourism
 Monfragüe National Park: It encompasses  or 17,852 hectares. The park contains one of the largest areas of Mediterranean forest and scrub in Spain with over 1,400 different species of trees. A favorite with birdwatchers, the park has the world's largest colony of Black Vulture and Spanish Imperial Eagle.
It has massive granite boulders with the only colony of White Stork nesting on them. There is also a medieval reservoir and a mill for wool washing. The building complex has been restores and houses a surprising collection of art by German artist Wolf Vostell, who was an important member of the fluxus movement. Spring brings an explosion of colour with the blossom of Spanish White Broom all pervasive in the area.
The Cáceres and Trujillo plains are protected under the ZEPA (Spanish for Special Protection Area for birds or SPA) protection figure.

Neighbourhoods
 Centre: 26,914 inhabitants.
 West (new): 15,726 inhabitants.
 South: 14,738 inhabitants.
 Mejostilla: 11,484 people.
 Aldea Moret: 6,756 inhabitants
 Old Town, 5,799 inhabitants.
 West: 4,591 inhabitants.
 North: 4,656 inhabitants.
 East: 2,646 inhabitants.
 Pedanías (Rincón de Ballesteros Valdesalor and Arroyo-Malpartida Station): 749 inhabitants.
 rest: 295 inhabitants.

Palaces and stately homes
 Palacio de los Golfines de Arriba
 Palacio de los Golfines de Abajo. Queen Isabella I of Castile and King Fernando I lived here.
 Palacio del Comendador de Alcuéscar
 Palacio-Fortaleza de los Torreorgaz, today a Parador hotel
 Palacio de Carvajal (15th century). It is now seat of the Patronage Office for Tourism and Handicraft of the province.

Shopping and cuisine

The small streets in the historical centre have many small shops selling typical products. The convents sell homemade sweets and pastries. Typical wines from Extremadura are affordable, full-bodied reds. Local liqueurs include cherry liqueur from the nearby Jerte valley, or other original liqueurs such as chestnut and blackberry. Other produce in the Province include sheep's cheese (Torta del Casar, is not made of goat's milk, but with milk from merino sheep), fig cake, chestnuts, hams and other pork products, lamb, olive oil, and paprika (pimentón de la Vera).

Salt-cured ham and red wine are produced locally and are officially recognized by the Spanish government. Both goat's and sheep's cheese are produced by traditional methods and renowned throughout the country. Cáceres is also famous for its stews, roast meats (especially pork, lamb and game), fried breadcrumbs (migas), trout, pastries and honey.

Sports

Among others notable sport teams, Cáceres is home to association football team CP Cacereño who currently play in the Tercera División and the professional basketball teams Cáceres Basket, who play the Liga LEB Oro, and Club Baloncesto Al-Qazeres, who play the Liga Femenina. And Rugby Union Extremadura CAR Cáceres playing DHB, 2nd National división.

Transport
The city is served by the Cáceres railway station. Also, across the street is the bus terminal, with multiple buses daily to other cities.

Twin towns
 Santiago de Compostela, Spain (since 1973)
La Roche-sur-Yon, France (since 1982)
Castelo Branco, Portugal
Portalegre, Portugal (since 2006)
Piano di Sorrento, Italy (since 2008)
Netanya, Israel (since 2010)
Lumbini, Nepal (since 2021)

Wall

 Torre de Bujaco (12th century)
 Arco de la Estrella (18th century)
 Torre de Sande (14th-15th centuries)

References

External links

 Cáceres City Council website 
 Cáceres sights (No longer working)

 
Municipalities in the Province of Cáceres
World Heritage Sites in Spain
Populated places established in the 1st century BC